Bruges Group may refer to
Groupe de Bruges, a European agricultural policy think tank
Bruges Group (United Kingdom), a British eurosceptic think tank